Eldridge is a nearly-deserted unincorporated community in Stutsman County, in the U.S. state of North Dakota.

History
A post office called Eldridge was established in 1880, and remained in operation until 1982. The community was named for a family of settlers.

References

Unincorporated communities in Stutsman County, North Dakota
Unincorporated communities in North Dakota